Smerinthulus dohrni is a species of moth of the  family Sphingidae. It is known from Malaysia and Sumatra.

References

Smerinthulus
Moths described in 1903